Marianus III (died 1321) was the sole Judge of Arborea from 1308 to his death. He co-ruled with his elder brother Andrew from the death of their father, John of Arborea, in 1304. Their mother was Vera Cappai. They were illegitimate.

In 1312, he was constrained by the Republic of Pisa to buy his own right of succession from the Emperor Henry VII and to marry Constance of Montalcino by proxy. In 1314, he requested aid from the Crown of Aragon against the Pisans.

He restored roads and bridges, complete the walls of Oristano and her defensive towers, and constructed a new archiepiscopal palace.

He never did marry Constance, but he did cohabitate with Padulesa de Serra, who gave him six children, among whom was his successor, Hugh II.

1321 deaths
Judges (judikes) of Arborea
Year of birth unknown